The 1888 United States presidential election in Minnesota took place on November 6, 1888, as part of the 1888 United States presidential election. Voters chose seven representatives, or electors to the Electoral College, who voted for president and vice president.

Minnesota voted for the Republican nominee, Benjamin Harrison, over the Democratic nominee, incumbent President Grover Cleveland. Harrison won the state by a margin of 14.47%.

With 5.82% of the popular vote, Minnesota would be the Prohibition Party candidate Clinton Fisk’s strongest victory in terms of percentage in the popular vote.

Results

Notes

See also
 United States presidential elections in Minnesota

References

Minnesota
1888
1888 Minnesota elections